An election to Cork City Council was held in Cork city in Ireland on 24 May 2019 as part of that year's local elections. Thirty-one councillors were elected from five local electoral areas (LEAs) by single transferable vote. This election broadly coincided with an increase in the city council area, and several outgoing members of Cork County Council, based in areas transferred to the city, stood for election to the city council. Besides extending all LEAs into the former county area, the former LEA of North Central was abolished and its area divided between North West and North East.

Under the Local Government Act 2019, voters in the city were also asked to contribute to a plebiscite on whether to have a directly elected executive mayor. Voters rejected the proposal in favour of retaining the existing ceremonial Lord Mayor of Cork, who is chosen annually by the councillors from among their number.

Results by party

Results by local electoral area

Cork City North East

Cork City North West

Cork City South Central

Cork City South East

Cork City South West

Results by gender

Plebiscite

Changes since 2019 local elections
Cork City North-East Fianna Fáil Cllr Kenneth O'Flynn quit the party and became an Independent after being refused a place on the party ticket for Cork North-Central in the 2020 general election.

Cork City South East Green Party Cllr Lorna Bogue quit the Green Party and became an Independent on 27 October 2020 in opposition to the passage of the Mother and Baby Homes Legislation through the Dáil.

See also
 2019 Cork North-Central by-election, on 28 November; seven of the candidates had run in the city council elections

Footnotes

Sources

References

External links 
 Cork City Council website

2019 Irish local elections
2019